Gelechia badiomaculella is a moth of the family Gelechiidae. It is found in North America, where it has been recorded from Kentucky.

The forewings are dark brown, with a short distinct ochreous-yellow oblique costal streak about the basal quarter, pointing towards a small ochreous-yellow raised tuft just within the middle of the dorsal margin. Between this tuft and the costa, but nearest to the costa, is an indistinct ochreous-yellow patch and on the disc are two minute ochreous yellow tufts. An ochreous-yellow streak is found at the base of the costal cilia, and another opposite it at the base of the dorsal cilias, nearly meeting in the middle of the wing. A row of minute ochreous-yellow tufts is found around the apex at the base. The tufts 
and spots are all pale ochreous yellow.

References

Moths described in 1872
Gelechia